National Sports Festival may refer to:

 National Sports Festival of Japan
 Korean National Sports Festival
 Nigerian National Sports Festival
 The original name for the U.S. Olympic Festival